Greeneview High School is a public high school in Jamestown, Ohio, United States.  It is the only high school in the Greeneview Local School District.  Their mascot is the Ram.

Ohio High School Athletic Association State Championships

 Boys Soccer – 2005
 Logan Lacure State Champion Wrestler-2016

Notable alumni
 Evan Bradds, college basketball player
 Gary Bradds, Ohio State and pro basketball player, third pick of 1964 NBA draft
 Matt Brown, The Ultimate Fighter 7 competitor; professional mixed martial artist fighting in the UFC
 Roland James, professional football player; played in Super Bowl for New England Patriots

References

External links
 District website

High schools in Greene County, Ohio
Public high schools in Ohio